Fluharty is a surname. Notable people with the surname include:

Shawn Fluharty (born 1984), American politician
Thomas Fluharty (born 1962), American illustrator and art educator

Surnames
Surnames of British Isles origin
Surnames of Irish origin
Anglicised Irish-language surnames